Merrywinebone is a locality in far north-western New South Wales, Australia. It is the current terminus of the Pokataroo railway line, and features a large grain loading facility. It is located in the Walgett Shire.

Localities in New South Wales
Walgett Shire